

League tables

Group I

Group II

Group III

Group IV

Group V

Group VI

Group VII

Group VIII

Promotion playoff

First round

Tiebreakers

Second round

Tiebreaker

Third round

Final Round

Notes

External links
LFP website

Tercera División seasons
3
Spain